The 2019 Villanova Wildcats football team represented Villanova University in the 2019 NCAA Division I FCS football season. They were led by third-year head coach Mark Ferrante and played their home games at Villanova Stadium. They were a member of the Colonial Athletic Association. They finished the season 9–4, 5–3 in CAA play to finish in a tie for third place. They received an at-large bid to the FCS Playoffs where they lost in the first round to Southeastern Louisiana.

Previous season

The Wildcats finished the 2018 season 5–6, 2–6 in CAA play to finish in a tie for tenth place.

Preseason

CAA poll
In the CAA preseason poll released on July 23, 2019, the Wildcats were predicted to finish in ninth place.

Preseason All–CAA team
The Wildcats did not have any players selected to the preseason all-CAA team.

Schedule

Game summaries

at Colgate

Lehigh

at Bucknell

at Towson

Maine

at William & Mary

at James Madison

Stony Brook

at New Hampshire

Richmond

LIU

Delaware

FCS Playoffs
The Wildcats were selected for the postseason tournament, with a first-round pairing against Southeastern Louisiana.

at Southeastern Louisiana–First Round

Ranking movements

References

Villanova
Villanova Wildcats football seasons
Villanova
Villanova Wildcats football